Kenneth Walsh may refer to:

 Kenneth A. Walsh (1916–1998), United States Marine Corps fighter ace in World War II
 Kenneth Andrew Walsh (born 1931), American/Canadian biochemist
 Ken Walsh (born 1945), American swimmer
 Kenneth T. Walsh, American journalist
 Kenneth Walsh (medical researcher), American medical researcher specializing in cardiovascular medicine
 Kenneth Walsh (politician), member of the Montana House of Representatives

See also
 Kenneth Welsh (1942–2022), Canadian actor